St Ignatius College, is a private Catholic primary and secondary school, located in La Paz, seat of government of Bolivia. The co-educational school was founded by the Society of Jesus in 1963. 

"San Ignacio" started its educational activities in 1963 as a primary school under the name "San Calixto Següencoma" with 235 students, many of them former pupils of San Calixto College. In 1970 an evening class named "Loyola" was implemented. In 1980 the school first admitted girls. In 1981 the schools "San Calixto Següencoma" and "Loyola" were merged into a single "Colegio San Ignacio".

See also

 Catholic Church in Bolivia
 Education in Bolivia
 List of Jesuit schools

References  

Jesuit primary schools in Bolivia
Schools in La Paz
Jesuit secondary schools in Bolivia
1963 establishments in Bolivia
Educational institutions established in 1963